Trout Brook, also known as White Creek is a river that is located in northern Otsego County, New York. The river starts at the outlet of Allen Lake and flows southeast before flowing into Otsego Lake south of Springfield Center. It is a third-order tributary on the northwest side of Otsego Lake and has an average gradient of 96 feet/mile.

References

Rivers of Otsego County, New York
Rivers of New York (state)